Zgornji Hotič (in older sources also Zgornje Hotiče) is a settlement on the left bank of the Sava River in the Municipality of Litija in central Slovenia. The area is part of the traditional region of Upper Carniola and is now included with the rest of the municipality in the Central Sava Statistical Region.

Church

The parish church in the settlement is dedicated to Saint Helena and belongs to the Roman Catholic Archdiocese of Ljubljana. It was built in 1686.

References

External links
Zgornji Hotič on Geopedia

Populated places in the Municipality of Litija